BBC Sessions is a compilation album with all The Specials' live BBC performances.

Track listing

References

BBC Radio recordings
1998 live albums
1998 compilation albums
EMI Records compilation albums
EMI Records live albums
The Specials compilation albums
The Specials live albums
Albums produced by Bob Sargeant